A partial linear space (also semilinear or near-linear space) is a basic incidence structure in the field of incidence geometry, that carries slightly less structure than a linear space.
The notion is equivalent to that of a linear hypergraph.

Definition
S is a partial linear space, if the following axioms hold:
 any line is incident with at least two points
 any pair of distinct points is incident with at most one line

If there is a unique line incident with every pair of distinct points, then we get a linear space.

Properties
The De Bruijn–Erdős theorem shows that in any finite linear space  which is not a single point or a single line, we have .

Examples 
 Projective space
 Affine space
 Polar space
 Generalized quadrangle
 Generalized polygon
 Near polygon

References
 .

Lynn Batten: Combinatorics of Finite Geometries. Cambridge University Press 1986, p. 1-22
Lynn Batten and  Albrecht Beutelspacher: The Theory of Finite Linear Spaces. Cambridge University Press, Cambridge, 1992.
Eric Moorhouse: Incidence Geometry. Lecture notes (archived)

External links
partial linear space at the University of Kiel
partial linear space at PlanetMath

Geometry